GMS (Groundwater Modeling System) is water modeling application for building and simulating groundwater models from Aquaveo. It features 2D and 3D geostatistics, stratigraphic modeling and a unique conceptual model approach. Currently supported models include MODFLOW, MODPATH, MT3DMS, RT3D, FEMWATER, SEEP2D, and UTEXAS.

Version 6 introduced the use of XMDF (eXtensible Model Data Format), which is a compatible extension of HDF5. The purpose of this is to allow internal storage and management of data in a single HDF file, rather than using many flat files.

History
GMS was initially developed in the late 1980s and early 1990s on Unix workstations by the Engineering Computer Graphics Laboratory at Brigham Young University. The development of GMS was funded primarily by The United States Army Corps of Engineers and was known—until version 4.0, released in late 1999—as the Department of Defense Groundwater Modeling System, or DoD GMS. It was ported to Microsoft Windows in the mid 1990s. Version 3.1 was the last version that supported HP-UX, IRIX, OSF/1, and Solaris platforms. Development of GMS—along with WMS and SMS—was transferred to Aquaveo when it formed in April 2007.

A study published in the Journal of Agricultural and Applied Economics in August 2000 stated that "GMS provides an interface to the groundwater flow model, MODFLOW, and the contaminant transport model, MT3D. MODFLOW is a three-dimensional, cell-centered, finite-difference, saturated-flow model capable of both steady-state and transient analyses...These two models, when put together, provide a comprehensive tool for examining groundwater flow and nitrate transport and accumulation". The study was designed to help develop a "permit scheme to effectively manage nitrate pollution of groundwater supplies for communities in rural areas without hindering agricultural production in watersheds".

Version history

Reception
A 2001 report prepared for the Iowa Comprehensive Petroleum Underground Storage Tank Fund Board stated that GMS was "a very user-friendly software package with strong technical support." Raymond H. Johnson, a hydrogeologist with the US Geological Survey, called GMS 6.0 "a useful all around groundwater modeling package that offers the advantages of modular purchases, multiple model support, linkages to ArcGIS, conceptual model development, and integrated inversion routines." A 2006 report from the Center for Nuclear Waste Regulatory Analyses in San Antonio, Texas called GMS "the most sophisticated groundwater modeling software available".

References

External links
GMS Wiki

Scientific simulation software
Science software for Windows
Hydrogeology software